Harold Ernest Evans  (20 October 1891 – 24 September 1980) was an English first-class cricketer and Royal Navy officer.

Evans was born at Hampstead in October 1891. After enlisting in the Royal Navy, he was promoted from the rank of midshipman to sub lieutenant in August 1912. He served in the Royal Navy during the First World War, with Evans being promoted to the rank of lieutenant in the first month of the war. Following the war, he made an OBE in August 1919 for valuable services during the war aboard . He made a single appearance in first-class cricket for the Royal Navy against Cambridge University at Fenner's in 1920. Batting twice in the match, he was dismissed for 2 runs in the Royal Navy first-innings by Charles Marriott, while in their second-innings he was dismissed for 3 runs by Clement Gibson. He was promoted to the rank of lieutenant commander in August 1922. Evans died at Crowthorne in September 1980.

References

External links

1891 births
1980 deaths
People from Hampstead
Royal Navy officers
Royal Navy personnel of World War I
Officers of the Order of the British Empire
English cricketers
Royal Navy cricketers